The Synagogue of Anderlecht is an Orthodox Synagogue in the municipality of Anderlecht, Brussels, Belgium. Located at the heart of the former Jewish quarter of Anderlecht, the synagogue is the main synagogue of the Orthodox Community of Brussels (French: Communauté Israélite Orthodoxe de Bruxelles, CIOB).

History 

From 1910, an Orthodox synagogue existed in the outskirts of Marolles, but it was later replaced by a larger synagogue on Rue de la Clinique. The Orthodox community was recognized by royal decree in 1912. At the beginning of the 20th century, Anderlecht had and influx of Jewish refugees, so construction of a large synagogue was seriously envisaged by the end of 1922. In 1926, the community bought a 500 Square metre plot of land and began construction on the building in 1928. Joseph de Lange, a Jewish architect from Antwerp, was put in charge of the project.  The community consecrated and inaugurated the synagogue, though it faced a precarious economic and political conditions in Europe.

Rabbi Joseph Serfaty, described the synagogues congregants as: "From one end came Ashkenazi Jews from Germany, from the other end were Sephardic Jews from Poland. The latter was much smaller and prayed in a small room upstairs".

During this period, the Brussels neighborhood of Cureghem became the Jewish quarter in the city. Jacob Meir Segalowitsch of Danzig was the first rabbi until 1940.

After the Holocaust 
After the Holocaust, a commemorative stone was placed at the entrance of the synagogue in honor of the Jews in the Orthodox community who were killed.  Joseph Gelernter, the rabbi of the synagogue and his family (except for his eldest son) were killed during the war.

Rabbi Isaac Steinberg became the rabbi during the war and he refinished the interior of the building. At one point, the building housed the offices of the Orthodox Jewish Community of Brussels, the Kosher Supervisory Commission of Brussels, the Orthodox Rabbinate, the Bet Din, and the Beit Midrash.

In 2010, Joël Rubinfeld said that the syangogue was completely deserted, due to the security issues in the neighborhood and the migration of the Jews of Anderlecht to other neighborhoods in Brussels. Albert Guigui, the Chief Rabbi of Brussels, explained that the synagogue is only opened on major Jewish holidays.

Anti-semitic incidents 
In 2010, a Molotov cocktail was thrown at the entrance door of the synagogue.

In September 2014, the synagogue was the victim of arson. The perpetrator was sentenced to six years in prison in December 2017, despite declaring his innocence.

In 2017 surveillance cameras at the synagogue were vandalized multiple times.

Bibliography 

 Isabelle Emmery (éd.) (2009), Histoire et mémoire des Juifs d'Anderlecht. Années 1920-1940

References 

20th-century synagogues
Religious buildings and structures in Brussels
Synagogues in Belgium
Antisemitism in Belgium
Art Deco architecture in Belgium
Orthodox Judaism in Belgium
1933 establishments in Belgium
Buildings and structures completed in 1933